The Trachtenberg School, officially the Trachtenberg School of Public Policy and Public Administration (TSPPPA), is the graduate school of public policy and public administration in the Columbian College of Arts and Sciences of the George Washington University, in Washington, D.C.

The Trachtenberg School offers Master of Public Policy, Master of Public Administration, and a PhD in Public Policy and Public Administration.

History
Long requested by George Washington, education in public service and government began at George Washington University with the construction of the Hall of Government in 1927.  The university gradually expanded its offerings in the field, and by 1950, public administration courses were offered in the School of Government, Department of Business, and the Department of Political Science.  In 1953, the Department of Political Science organized these offerings into a Master of Arts in Public Administration degree.  To address the call for professional training in public administration, in 1956, graduate level public administration courses were consolidated into the newly formed Department of Business and Public Administration in the School of Government.  The school was subsequently reorganized in 1963 into the School of Government and Business Administration, including a Department of Public Administration.  That same year, the department began offering a Master of Public Administration degree. The program consisted of 36 credit hours of coursework following the early guidelines of the National Association of Public Administration and Public Affairs.  Further changes to the program expanded the course of study to a 40 credit hour program.  The Columbian College of Arts and Sciences also established Masters of Public Policy and PhD in Public Policy programs.  In 2003, all three programs were merged into the School of Public Policy and Public Administration within the Columbian College of Arts and Sciences.  The School was recognized as one of the seven academic units designated as signature programs of selective excellence within the University.  Most recently, in 2007, the university Board of Trustees renamed the School of Public Policy and Public Administration the Trachtenberg School of Public Policy and Public Administration in recognition of President-emeritus Stephen Joel Trachtenberg.

Academics
The Trachtenberg School of Public Policy and Public Administration offers master's degrees in public policy, public administration, and environmental and natural resource policy, as well as a PhD in Public Policy and Administration and certificates in Nonprofit Management, Environmental Resource Policy, and Budget & Public Finance.

The Master of Public Administration (MPA) and Master of Public Policy (MPP) degrees each consist of a core curriculum and a field of study chosen by students.  Many of these fields of study are offered in partnership with other schools within the university, including the Elliott School of International Affairs, School of Public Health and Health Services, and Graduate School of Education & Human Development. The Trachtenberg School is one of only a few schools to offer both MPA and MPP degrees accredited by the National Association of Schools of Public Affairs and Administration (NASPAA).

The Master of Arts in Environmental and Natural Resources Policy (ENRP) builds upon the foundation of a public policy program with a focus on environmental and natural resource issues and concepts. The ENRP program offers a multidisciplinary approach to environmental and sustainability studies, with a core curriculum that includes environmental economics, environmental law, public policy and policy analysis, research methods, and environmental sciences.

The PhD in Public Policy and Public Administration offers a rigorous multidisciplinary curriculum that prepares students for careers in university teaching and research, research institutions, federal, state, and local governments, and international organizations.  In addition to developing broad analytical skills in multiple subjects, students take courses designed to prepare them to undertake research in specific areas of public policy and administration. Through course work in each specialized field, students develop expertise for a variety of careers in the public and private sectors.

In addition to degrees offered solely by the Trachtenberg School, the school offers combined MPA/JD and MPP/JD degree programs with The George Washington University Law School and a joint MPP/PhD with the Department of Political Science, as well as various combined Bachelor of Arts/MPP and BA/MPA degrees for undergraduates.

Rankings
U.S. News & World Report University Rankings ranks the Trachtenberg School as the 10th best public affairs school in the United States and as having the 6th best Global Policy program, 11th best public management program, the 14th best health policy program, and the 20th best social policy program in the U.S.

Research
The Trachtenberg School is affiliated with several research centers at The George Washington University. Many faculty and students perform research in partnership with these centers. The centers are:
The George Washington Institute for Public Policy
Regulatory Studies Center
The Center for Washington Area Studies
The State and Local Fiscal Policy Program
The Midge Smith Center for Evaluation Effectiveness

Notable alumni

Notable faculty

Susan Dudley
Christopher H. Sterling
Kathryn Newcomer
Edward Berkowitz
Marcus Raskin
Stephen Joel Trachtenberg
Scott Pace
Mary Landrieu

References

External links

Colleges and Schools of The George Washington University
Public administration schools in the United States
Educational institutions established in 2003
2003 establishments in Washington, D.C.
Columbian College of Arts and Sciences